Pavle Grbović (born 19 November 1993) is a Serbian politician. He has been the president of the Movement of Free Citizens (PSG) since 2020 and a member of the National Assembly of Serbia since 2022.

Early life and education 

He was born in 1993 in Belgrade which at the time was a part of the Federal Republic of Yugoslavia. He finished middle and high school in Belgrade.

In 2012, he enrolled at the Faculty of Law, University of Belgrade. He graduated in 2016 as one of the best students in the generation. After that, he received a master's degree at the same faculty. He received multiple awards for excellent success in all years of study and awards in several competitions in writing thematic papers in the legal profession.

Political career 
He made a decision to join the Movement of Free Citizens in August 2017 after the 2017 presidential elections and the forming of the movement. Within the movement, he performed the functions of media team coordinator, secretary and member of the Executive Board and secretary of the Presidency. Currently, he is a member of the presidency of the movement.

He was on the electoral list of the Movement of Free Citizens, People's Party and Dragan Đilas for the 2018 Belgrade City Assembly election. The coalition finished second and Grbović was elected a member of the City Assembly. He said that he does not expect to be privileged because he is young, but that he is also not afraid to oppose opinions and arguments with the elderly because of his age.

He said that the biggest problem of Serbia today is the lack of empathy, solidarity and willingness to face real problems and social decadence and a tendency towards populism, nationalism and chauvinism.

After a bad result at the 2020 Serbian parliamentary elections in which the Movement of Free Citizens only won 1.58% of the popular vote, new presidential elections were announced within the movement, and Grbović was the only candidate for president of the movement and on 27 September 2020, he became the new president.

On 3 April 2022, during the general election, Grbović was attacked by the ruling Serbian Progressive Party (SNS) activists near their local board in Nova Galenika, Belgrade.

Personal life 
On 10 November 2020, Grbović announced on Facebook that he had been tested positive for COVID-19. He married Nina Stojaković in September 2022.

References 

1993 births
Living people
Members of the City Assembly of Belgrade
University of Belgrade Faculty of Law alumni
Movement of Free Citizens (Serbia) politicians